Whippoorwill commonly refers to the eastern whip-poor-will, a North American bird.

Whippoorwill or Whip-poor-will may also refer to:

 The 1978 Whippoorwill tornado
 Mexican whip-poor-will, a bird of the southwestern United States and Mexico
 Whippoorwill, Oklahoma, a census-designated place in the United States
 The Whippoorwill Club, a country club near Armonk, New York, United States
 Whippoorwill Creek, a stream in Montgomery County, Missouri, United States
 Whippoorwill (train), a defunct Chicago and Eastern Illinois Railroad passenger train
 USS Whippoorwill, two US Navy ships
 The Whippoorwill, a 2012 album by Blackberry Smoke

See also
 Whip-poor-will flower or Trillium cernuum, a North American flowering plant